The 1920 Coupe de France Final was a football match held at Stade Bergeyre, Paris on 9 May 1920, that saw CA Paris defeat Le Havre AC 2–1 thanks to goals by Henri Bard.

Match details

See also
Coupe de France 1919-1920

External links
Coupe de France results at Rec.Sport.Soccer Statistics Foundation
Report on French federation site

Coupe De France Final
1920
Coupe De France Final 1920
May 1920 sports events
1920 in Paris